Winchester Park is a neighborhood in Far Northeast Philadelphia. It is located in the vicinity of Pennypack Park, north and west of Holmesburg.

It is a neighborhood of single family homes. The first part of the development, on Winchester Avenue between Albion Street and 75' east of Holmehurst Ave was built in 1940. The remainder of the area was built between 1947- 1955. In 1955 St Jerome R.C. Church, was built at Colfax and Stamford Streets. It is the parish that serves the area. The zip code is 19136. Winchester Park's boundaries are Holme Avenue, Welsh Road and Rhawn Street.

References

Neighborhoods in Philadelphia
Northeast Philadelphia